Luís Filipe de Jesus Vieira Duarte Gonçalves is a Portuguese football manager.

In August 2019, he was appointed as manager of the Mozambique national football team.

References

1972 births
Mozambique national football team managers
Living people
Portuguese football managers